"Mansions of the Lord" is a hymn written by Randall Wallace and set to the music of Nick Glennie-Smith. There is a German version called .

Performances 

"Mansions" was originally written for the 2002 film We Were Soldiers, and was performed by the United States Military Academy Glee Club and the Metro Voices.

The hymn also served as the recessional in the 2004 funeral of President Ronald Reagan. That rendition was sung by the Armed Forces Chorus with the United States Marine Chamber Orchestra.

The hymn is featured on the CD of the same name by the Morriston Orpheus Choir from Wales.

Lyrics 
To fallen soldiers let us sing
Where no rockets fly nor bullets wing
Our broken brothers let us bring
To the Mansions of the Lord

No more bleeding, no more fight
No prayers pleading through the night
Just divine embrace, Eternal light
In the Mansions of the Lord

Where no mothers cry and no children weep
We will stand and guard though the angels sleep
All through the ages safely keep
The Mansions of the Lord

German lyrics

References
 Reagan Services's 'Mansions of the Lord' — National Public Radio, June 14, 2004. With lyrics and audio.

American Christian hymns